The 2019 King's Cup Sepaktakraw World Championship is the 34th edition of the sepak takraw's premier tournament King's Cup World Championship, organized by the Takraw Association of Thailand and the International Sepaktakraw Federation (ISTAF), during August 25 – September 1, 2019, at Fashion Island, Bangkok. Thirty-one ISTAF's member countries with a total of more than 500 players participated in the tournament, which featured both men and women categories. The tournament was live broadcast from August 27 to September 1 on Mono 29, Mono Max, and Mono Plus, the satellite television channels in Thailand.

The tournament consists of 281 total match plays, which were divided into two divisions, namely; the Premier division (PM) and the Division 1 (D1), each division consists of 3 events, including; Double, Regu, and Team. All stated events were separated into 2 categories viz; men's and women's. However, no division 1 was assigned for the women category because of the limited quantity of women team participate. Due to the mentioned reasons, the hoop race was likewise conducted on only two events, including men's and women's, with no separated division.

Thailand was the greatest conqueror of the tournament by acquiring six gold medals from all regu and team categories in the premier division, as well as, the hoop categories, followed by Myanmar, which gained two golds from men's and women's double in the premier division. India, Iran, and Singapore, each obtained 1 gold in division 1; men regu, men team, and men double, respectively. Like the previous edition, the winner of each category in division 1 will automatically advance to the Premier Division in the forthcoming tournament.

Participating countries
The Thirty-one ISTAF member associations, mostly from Asia–Oceania, are ranked and allocated into the groups based on their performance in the previous edition. The winner of each category in Division 1 of the 2018 edition was automatically placing on the Premier division. France and Macao were early expected to take part in the tournament but withdrew for undisclosed reasons. Afghanistan made its debut in this edition with the Men's Double (MD) event after becoming the ISTAF membership in early 2019. Thailand did not compete in both men's and women's doubles, in order to give others chances of winning medals.

Premier division

Group stage

Men's Double

Group A

Group B

Group C

Group D

Men's Regu

Group A

Group B

Group C

Group D

Women's Double

Group A

Group B

Group C

Group D

Women's Regu

Group A

Group B

Group C

Group D

Final round

Men's Double

Men's Regu

Men's team

Women's Double

Women's Regu

Women's team

Division 1

Group stage

Men's Double

Group A

Group B

Group C

Group D

Men's Regu

Group A

Group B

Group C

Group D

Final Round

Men's Double

Men's Regu

Men's team

Hoop event

Men category
Ranking round
The ranking round of Men's Hoop events was conducted on the first day of the tournament. The four highest-scoring teams will progress to the final round.  Nevertheless, as of twelve national teams which inquired to compete, four of them later withdrew from the event for undisclosed reasons namely; Brazil, Oman, and Nepal. Meanwhile, Brunei, the Philippines, Thailand, and Vietnam, secured their place in the final round, the scoring result was listed below;

Final round

Women category

Nations

Final standing

Premier division ranking

Division 1 ranking

Medal table (Premier divisions)

Medal table (Division 1)

See also
 2022 King's Cup Sepaktakraw World Championship

References

King's Cup Sepaktakraw World Championship
2019 in Thai sport
August 2019 sports events in Thailand
2019 sports events in Bangkok